The mixed doubles competition at the 1992 French Open was held between May 25 and June 7, 1992, on the outdoor clay courts at the Stade Roland Garros in Paris, France. Arantxa Sánchez Vicario and Todd Woodbridge won the title, defeating Lori McNeil and Bryan Shelton in the final.

Seeds

Draw

Finals

Top half

Section 1

Section 2

Bottom half

Section 3

Section 4

External links
 Main draw
1992 French Open – Doubles draws and results at the International Tennis Federation

Mixed Doubles
French Open by year – Mixed doubles